Bowman may refer to:

Places

Antarctica
 Bowman Coast
 Bowman Island
 Bowman Peninsula

Australia
 Bowman Park, a park in South Australia
 Bowmans, South Australia, a locality
 Division of Bowman, an electoral district for the Australian House of Representatives
 See also Bomen, New South Wales

Canada
 Bowman, Quebec, a village and municipality
 Bowman Bay (Nunavut)

United States
 Bowman, Chicot County, Arkansas, an unincorporated community
 Bowman, Craighead County, Arkansas, an unincorporated community
 Bowman, California, an unincorporated community
 Bowman, Georgia, a city
 Bowman, Indiana, an unincorporated community
 Bowman County, North Dakota
 Bowman, North Dakota, a city and county seat
 Bowman Creek, a tributary of the Susquehanna River in Pennsylvania
 Bowman, South Carolina, a town
 Bowman, Tennessee, a census-designated place and unincorporated community
 Bowman Bay (Washington)

People
 Bowman (surname)
 Bowman, a person who practices archery

Arts and entertainment
 "The Bowmans", a 1961 episode of the BBC television situation comedy Hancock
 David Bowman, protagonist of the film 2001: A Space Odyssey
 "The Bowman", the fictional character Shumpert in The Walking Dead television series

Other uses
 Bowman baronets, two titles in the Baronetage of the United Kingdom
 Bowman (communications system), the new digital battlefield communications system for the British Army
 Bowman Field (disambiguation), several airports, a stadium, and part of the grounds of a university
 Bowman Flag, a historical Australian flag
 Bowman Gum, a maker of bubble gum and baseball cards
 Bowman Hotel (Nogales, Arizona), on the National Register of Historic Places
 Bowman Hotel (Pendleton, Oregon), on the National Register of Historic Places
 Bowman, in the sport of rowing, the rower seated nearest the bow
 Bowman, a cultivar of barley

See also
 Bowman Dam (disambiguation)
 Bowman House (disambiguation)
 Bowmans (disambiguation)
 Bowman's capsule, a part of the kidneys found in mammals
 Bowman's layer, in the cornea of the eye